The Committee for Skeptical Inquiry (CSI), formerly known as the Committee for the Scientific Investigation of Claims of the Paranormal (CSICOP), is a program within the U.S. non-profit organization Center for Inquiry (CFI), which seeks to "promote scientific inquiry, critical investigation, and the use of reason in examining controversial and extraordinary claims." Paul Kurtz proposed the establishment of CSICOP in 1976 as an independent non-profit organization (before merging with CFI as one of its programs in 2015), to counter what he regarded as an uncritical acceptance of, and support for, paranormal claims by both the media and society in general. Its philosophical position is one of scientific skepticism. CSI's fellows have included notable scientists, Nobel laureates, philosophers, psychologists, educators and authors. It is headquartered in Amherst, New York.

History 

The committee was officially launched on April 30, 1976, and was co-chaired by Paul Kurtz and Marcello Truzzi. In the early 1970s, scientific skeptics were concerned that interest in the paranormal was on the rise in the United States, part of a growing tide of irrationalism. In 1975, Kurtz, a secular humanist, initiated a statement, "Objections to Astrology", which was co-written with Bart Bok and Lawrence E. Jerome, and endorsed by 186 scientists including 19 Nobel laureates. The statement was published in the American Humanist Association (AHA)'s newsletter The Humanist, of which Kurtz was then editor. According to Kurtz, the statement was sent to every newspaper in the United States and Canada. The statement received a positive reaction which encouraged Kurtz to invite skeptical researchers to a 1976 conference with the aim of establishing a new organization to critically examine a wide range of paranormal claims. Attendees included Martin Gardner, Ray Hyman, James Randi, and Marcello Truzzi, all members of the Resources for the Scientific Evaluation of the Paranormal (RSEP), a fledgling group with objectives similar to those CSI would subsequently adopt.

RSEP disbanded and its members, along with Carl Sagan, Isaac Asimov, B.F. Skinner, and Philip J. Klass, then joined Kurtz, Randi, Gardner and Hyman to formally found the Committee for Scientific Investigation of Claims of the Paranormal (CSICOP). Kurtz, Randi, Gardner and Hyman took seats on the executive board. CSICOP was officially launched at a specially convened conference of the AHA on April 30 and May 1, 1976.

According to the published correspondence between Gardner and Truzzi, disagreements over what CSICOP should be shown how volatile the beginnings of the organization were. Truzzi criticised CSICOP for "act[ing] more like lawyers" taking on a position of dismissal before evaluating the claims, saying that CSICOP took a "debunking stance". Gardner on the other hand "opposed 'believers' in the paranormal becoming CSICOP members" which Truzzi supported. Gardner felt that Truzzi "conferred too much respectability to nonsense".

CSICOP was funded in part with donations and sales of their magazine, Skeptical Inquirer.

Mission statement

The formal mission statement, approved in 2006 and still current, states:The Committee for Skeptical Inquiry promotes science and scientific inquiry, critical thinking, science education, and the use of reason in examining important issues. It encourages the critical investigation of controversial or extraordinary claims from a responsible, scientific point of view and disseminates factual information about the results of such inquiries to the scientific community, the media, and the public.A shorter version of the mission statement appears in every issue: "... promotes scientific inquiry, critical investigation, and the use of reason in examining controversial and extraordinary claims." A previous mission statement referred to "investigation of paranormal and fringe-science claims", but the 2006 change recognized and ratified a wider purview for CSI and its magazine, Skeptical Inquirer, that includes "new science related issues at the intersection of science and public concerns, while not ignoring [their] core topics". A history of the first two decades is available in The Encyclopedia of the Paranormal published in 1998 by S.I. editor Kendrick Frazier. In 2018, Frazier reemphasized the importance of the committee's work by saying that "[w]e need independent, evidence-based, science-based critical investigation and inquiry now more than perhaps at any other time in our history."

Name
Paul Kurtz was inspired by the 1949 Belgian organization Comité Para, whose full name was Comité Belge pour l'Investigation Scientifique des Phénomènes Réputés Paranormaux ("Belgian Committee for Scientific Investigation of Purported Paranormal Phenomena"). In 1976, the proposed name was "Committee for the Scientific Investigation of Claims of the Paranormal and Other Phenomena" which was shortened to "Committee for the Scientific Investigation of Claims of the Paranormal". The initial acronym, "CSICP" was difficult to pronounce and so was changed to "CSICOP".  According to James Alcock, it was never intended to be "Psi Cop", a nickname that some of the group's detractors adopted.

In November 2006, CSICOP further shortened its name to "Committee for Skeptical Inquiry" (CSI), pronounced C-S-I.  The reasons for the change were to create a name that was shorter, more "media-friendly", to remove "paranormal" from the name, and to reflect more accurately the actual scope of the organization with its broader focus on critical thinking, science, and rationality in general, and because "it includes the root words of our magazine's title, the Skeptical Inquirer".

Activities 
In order to carry out its mission, the committee "maintains a network of people interested in critically examining paranormal, fringe science, and other claims, and in contributing to consumer education; prepares bibliographies of published materials that carefully examine such claims;encourages research by objective and impartial inquiry in areas where it is needed; convenes conferences and meetings; publishes articles that examine claims of the paranormal; does not reject claims on a priori grounds, antecedent to inquiry, but examines them objectively and carefully".

Standard 
An axiom often repeated among CSI members is the quote "extraordinary claims require extraordinary evidence", which Carl Sagan made famous and adapted from an earlier quote by Marcello Truzzi: "An extraordinary claim requires extraordinary proof". (Truzzi in turn traced the idea back through the Principle of Laplace to the philosopher David Hume.)

According to CSI member Martin Gardner, CSI regularly puts into practice H. L. Mencken's maxim "one horse-laugh is worth a thousand syllogisms."

Publications 

CSI publishes the magazine Skeptical Inquirer, which was founded by Truzzi, under the name The Zetetic. The journal was under Tuzzi's editorship for the first year, until August 1977. The magazine was retitled to Skeptical Inquirer with Kendrick Frazier, former editor of Science News, serving as its editor. In 1987, Cecil Adams of The Straight Dope called Skeptical Inquirer "one of the nation's leading antifruitcake journals". In addition, CSI publishes Skeptical Briefs, a quarterly newsletter for associate members.

CSI conducts and publishes investigations into Bigfoot and UFO sightings, psychics, astrologers, alternative medicine, religious cults, and paranormal or pseudoscientific claims.

Conferences 

CSICOP has held dozens of conferences between 1983 and 2005, two of them in Europe, and all six World Skeptics Congresses so far were sponsored by it. Since 2011, the conference is known as CSICon. Two conventions have been held in conjunction with its sister and parent organizations, CSH and CFI, in 2013 and 2015. The conferences bring together some of the most prominent figures in scientific research, science communication and skeptical activism, to exchange information on all topics of common concern and to strengthen the movement and community of skeptics.

CSI has also supported local grassroot efforts, such as SkeptiCamp community-organized conferences.

Response to mass media 
Many CSI activities are oriented towards the media. As CSI's former executive director Lee Nisbet wrote in the 25th-anniversary issue of the group's journal, Skeptical Inquirer:

Involvement with mass media continues to the present day with, for example, CSI founding the Council for Media Integrity in 1996, and co-producing a TV documentary series Critical Eye hosted by William B. Davis. CSI members can be seen regularly in the mainstream media offering their perspective on a variety of paranormal claims. In 1999 Joe Nickell was appointed special consultant on a number of investigative documentaries for the BBC. As a media-watchdog, CSI has "mobilized thousands of scientists, academics and responsible communicators" to criticize what it regards as "media's most blatant excesses". Criticism has focused on factual TV programming or newspaper articles offering support for paranormal claims, and programs such as The X-Files and Buffy the Vampire Slayer, which its members believe portray skeptics and science in a bad light and help to promote belief in the paranormal. CSI's website currently lists the email addresses of over ninety U.S. media organizations and encourages visitors to "directly influence" the media by contacting "the networks, the TV shows and the editors responsible for the way [they portray] the world."

Following pseudoscientific and paranormal belief trends 

CSI was quoted to consider pseudoscience topics to include yogic flying, therapeutic touch, astrology, fire walking, voodoo, magical thinking, Uri Geller, alternative medicine, channeling,  psychic hotlines and detectives, near-death experiences, unidentified flying objects (UFOs), the Bermuda Triangle, homeopathy, faith healing, and reincarnation.
CSI changes its focus with the changing popularity and prominence of what it considers to be pseudoscientific and paranormal belief. For example, as promoters of intelligent design increased their efforts to include it in school curricula in recent years, CSI stepped up its attention to the subject, creating an "Intelligent Design Watch" website publishing numerous articles on evolution and intelligent design in Skeptical Inquirer and on the Internet.

CSI Chief Investigator

In September 2022, Kenny Biddle was announced as CSI's Chief Investigator.  Biddle is a CSI Fellow  and writes a column for Skeptical Inquirer called A Closer Look (2018-present), which focuses on his use of scientific skepticism to investigate paranormal claims, including ghost photography and video, ghost hunting equipment, UFOs and psychic ability.  Biddle credits his previous careers as an auto mechanic, helicopter mechanic and X-ray technician for building his skills in attention to details, problem solving, testing and critical thinking. Biddle also has co-written articles with Joe Nickell about ghost and miraculous photography. Biddle was a speaker at CSICon in 2019 and 2022.

Health and safety 
CSI is concerned with paranormal or pseudoscientific claims that may endanger people's health or safety, such as the use of alternative medicine in place of science-based healthcare. Investigations by CSI and others, including consumer watchdog groups, law enforcement and government regulatory agencies, have shown that the sale of alternative medicines, paranormal paraphernalia, or pseudoscience-based products can be enormously profitable. CSI says this profitability has provided various pro-paranormal groups large resources for advertising, lobbying efforts, and other forms of advocacy, to the detriment of public health and safety.

Organization

Umbrella organization 
The Center for Inquiry is the transnational non-profit umbrella organization comprising CSI, the Council for Secular Humanism, the Center for Inquiry – On Campus (national youth group) and the Commission for Scientific Medicine and Mental Health. These organizations share headquarters and some staff, and each have their own list of fellows and their distinct mandates. CSI generally addresses questions of religion only in cases in which testable scientific assertions have been made (such as weeping statues or faith healing).

Independent Investigation Group 

The Center for Inquiry West, located in Hollywood, California Executive Director Jim Underdown founded the Independent Investigations Group (IIG), a volunteer-based organization in January 2000. The IIG investigates fringe science, paranormal and extraordinary claims from a rational, scientific viewpoint and disseminates factual information about such inquiries to the public. IIG has offered a $50,000 prize "to anyone who can show, under proper observing conditions, evidence of any paranormal, supernatural, or occult power or event", to which 7 people applied from 2009 to 2012.

Awards

In Praise of Reason Award

"The In Praise of Reason Award is given in recognition of distinguished contributions in the use of critical inquiry, scientific evidence, and reason in evaluating claims to knowledge." This is the highest award presented by CSI and is often presented at the CSIcon conferences.

Candle Awards

Founded at the 1996 World Skeptics Congress in Buffalo, New York, the Council for Media Integrity gives these awards that were named in inspiration by Carl Sagan's book, The Demon-Haunted World: Science as a Candle in the Dark. The council is made up of scientists, media and academics, all concerned with the "balanced portrayal of science". The Candle in the Dark Award is presented to those who show "outstanding contributions to the public's understanding of science and scientific principles" and to "reward sound science television programming". The Snuffed Candle Award is awarded to those "for encouraging credulity, presenting pseudoscience as genuine, and contributing to the public's lack of understanding of the methods of scientific inquiry." The council urges TV "producers to label documentary-type shows depicting the paranormal as either entertainment or fiction". The council also provides the media with contact information of experts who would be willing and able to answer questions and be interviewed for paranormal topics.

Robert P. Balles Prize 

CSI awards the Robert P. Balles Annual Prize in Critical Thinking annually. The $2,500 award is given to the "creator of the published work that best exemplifies healthy skepticism, logical analysis, or empirical science". Robert P. Balles, "a practicing Christian", established this permanent endowment fund through a Memorial Fund. Center for Inquiry's "established criteria for the prize include use of the most parsimonious theory to fit data or to explain apparently preternatural phenomena."

Responsibility in Journalism Award
CSICOP seeking to acknowledge and encourage "fair and balanced reporting of paranormal claims" established the Responsibility in Journalism Award in 1984. Frazier stated that "There are many responsible reporters who want to do a good job in covering these kinds of controversial, exotic topics." Beginning in 1991, CSI began awarding in two categories, "print" and "broadcast".

Frontiers of Science and Technology Award

Public Education in Science Award
In recognition of distinguished contributions to the testing of scientific principles and to the public understanding of science.

Distinguished Skeptic Award

Founder Award
Presented to founder and chairman of CSICOP, Paul Kurtz "In recognition of your wisdom, courage, and foresight in establishing and leading the world's first public education organization devoted to distinguishing science from pseudoscience". Award was given April 26, 1986 at the University of Colorado, Boulder.

The Martin Gardner Lifetime Achievement Award
Awarded to author and entertainer Steve Allen at the First World Skeptic Congress held in Buffalo, New York, in 1996. Allen was recognized for his lifetime achievement "in cultivating the public appreciation of critical thinking and science".

Lifetime Achievement Award
Presented to Eugenie Scott by Ronald Lindsay at the CFI Summit in Tacoma, Washington, in 2013 calling her an "Champion of Evolution Education".

The Isaac Asimov Award
Established to acknowledge the contributions to humanity and science by Isaac Asimov. This award is given to those who has "shown outstanding commitment and ability in communicating the achievements, methods, and issues of science to the public".

The Pantheon of Skeptics
In April 2011, the executive council of CSI created The Pantheon of Skeptics, a special roster honoring deceased fellows of the Committee who have made the most outstanding contributions to the causes of science and skepticism. This roster is part of an ongoing effort to provide a sense of history about the modern skeptical movement.

CSI fellows 
According to the Jan/Feb 2021 Skeptical Inquirer the role of a CSI fellow is to "promote scientific inquiry, critical investigation, and the use of reason in examining controversial and extraordinary claims. Fellows are elected for their distinguished contributions to science and skepticsim as well as their ability to provide practical advice and expertise on various issues and projects deemed important to the work of the Committee. Election as a fellow is based upon the following criteria, approved by the CSI Executive Council: 
 1. Outstanding contribution to a scientific discipline, preferably, thought not restricted to, a field related to the skeptical movement
 2. Outstanding contribution to the communication of science and/or critical thinking or
 3. Outstanding contribution to the skeptical movement.
Fellows of CSI serve as ambassadors of science and skepticism and may be consulted on issues related to their area of expertise by the media or by the Committee. They may be asked to support statements issued by CSI and contribute commentary or articles to CSI outlets.  ... Election to the position of fellow is a lifetime appointment. However, if in the opinion of the CSI Executive Council an individual's behavior or scholarship renders that person unable to continue to qualify for the position of fellow under the criteria listed or to effectively fulfill the role of ambassador or science and skepticism, CSI may choose to remove them from the list of fellows."

Current CSI fellows 

This is a list of current CSI fellows; an asterisk denotes the person is also a member of the CSI Executive Council.

Former CSI fellows 
This is a list of former CSI fellows not included in the Pantheon of Skeptics.

Controversy and criticism 

CSI's activities have garnered criticism from individuals or groups which have been the focus of the organization's attention.  Television celebrity and claimed psychic Uri Geller, for example, was until recently in open dispute with the organization, filing a number of unsuccessful lawsuits against them. Some criticism has also come from within the scientific community and at times from within CSI itself. Marcello Truzzi, one of CSICOP's co-founders, left the organization after only a short time, arguing that many of those involved "tend to block honest inquiry, in my opinion. Most of them are not agnostic toward claims of the paranormal; they are out to knock them. [...] When an experiment of the paranormal meets their requirements, then they move the goal posts." Truzzi coined the term pseudoskeptic to describe critics in whom he detected such an attitude.

Mars effect, 1975 
An early controversy concerned the so-called Mars effect: French statistician Michel Gauquelin's claim that champion athletes are more likely to be born when the planet Mars is in certain positions in the sky. In late 1975, prior to the formal launch of CSICOP, astronomer Dennis Rawlins, along with Paul Kurtz, George Abell and Marvin Zelen (all subsequent members of CSICOP) began investigating the claim. Rawlins, a founding member of CSICOP at its launch in May 1976, resigned in early 1980 claiming that other CSICOP researchers had used incorrect statistics, faulty science, and outright falsification in an attempt to debunk Gauquelin's claims. In an article for the pro-paranormal magazine Fate, he wrote: "I am still skeptical of the occult beliefs CSICOP was created to debunk. But I have changed my mind about the integrity of some of those who make a career of opposing occultism." CSICOP's Philip J. Klass responded by circulating an article to CSICOP members critical of Rawlins' arguments and motives; Klass's unpublished response, refused publication by Fate, itself became the target for further criticism.

Church of Scientology, 1977 

In 1977, an FBI raid on the offices of the Church of Scientology uncovered a project to discredit CSICOP so that it and its publications would cease criticism of Dianetics and Scientology. This included forging a CIA memo and sending it to media sources, including The New York Times, to spread rumors that CSICOP was a front group for the CIA. A letter from CSICOP founder Paul Kurtz was forged to discredit him in the eyes of parapsychology researchers.

Natasha Demkina, 2004 

In 2004, CSICOP was accused of scientific misconduct over its involvement in the Discovery Channel's test of the "girl with X-ray eyes", Natasha Demkina. In a self-published commentary, Nobel Prize-winning physicist Brian Josephson criticized the test and evaluation methods and argued that the results should have been deemed "inconclusive" rather than judged in the negative. Josephson, the director of the University of Cambridge's Mind–Matter Unification Project, questioned the researchers' motives, saying: "On the face of it, it looks as if there was some kind of plot to discredit the teenage claimed psychic by setting up the conditions to make it likely that they could pass her off as a failure." Ray Hyman, one of the three researchers who designed and conducted the test, published a response to this and other criticisms. CSI's Commission for Scientific Medicine and Mental Health also published a detailed response to these and other objections, saying that the choice of critical level was appropriate, because her claims were unlikely to be true: I decided against setting the critical level at seven because this would require Natasha to be 100% accurate in our test. We wanted to give her some leeway. More important, setting the critical value at seven would make it difficult to detect a true effect. On the other hand, I did not want to set the critical value at four because this would be treating the hypothesis that she could see into people's bodies as if it were highly plausible. The compromise was to set the value at five.

General criticism and reply 

On a more general level, proponents of parapsychology have accused CSI of pseudoskepticism,  and an overly dogmatic and arrogant approach based on a priori convictions. A 1992 article in The Journal of the American Society for Psychical Research, an organ for the Parapsychological Association, suggests that CSI's aggressive style of skepticism could discourage scientific research into the paranormal. Astronomer Carl Sagan wrote on this in 1995:

Have I ever heard a skeptic wax superior and contemptuous? Certainly. I've even sometimes heard, to my retrospective dismay, that unpleasant tone in my own voice. There are human imperfections on both sides of this issue. Even when it's applied sensitively, scientific skepticism may come across as arrogant, dogmatic, heartless, and dismissive of the feelings and deeply held beliefs of others ... CSICOP is imperfect. In certain cases [criticism of CSICOP] is to some degree justified. But from my point of view CSICOP serves an important social function – as a well-known organization to which media can apply when they wish to hear the other side of the story, especially when some amazing claim of pseudoscience is judged newsworthy ... CSICOP represents a counterbalance, although not yet nearly a loud enough voice, to the pseudoscience gullibility that seems second nature to so much of the media.

See also 
 Lists about skepticism
National Council Against Health Fraud
Point of Inquiry CSI podcast
Quackwatch

Footnotes

References 
Notes

Bibliography

External links 
 

Non-profit organizations based in New York (state)
Skeptic organizations in the United States
Organizations established in 1976
Scientology-related controversies
Inquiry
1976 establishments in the United States